The George L. Mosse Prize is a history book prize awarded annually by the American Historical Association for "an outstanding major work of extraordinary scholarly distinction, creativity, and originality in the intellectual and cultural history of Europe since 1500".

Description 

The prize, named after the eminent historian George Mosse, was established in 2000 with funds donated by former students, colleagues, and friends of the late Professor Mosse. Nominated books must be of high scholarly distinction, showing exceptional research accuracy, originality, and literary merit.

Notable winners 

Past winners of the prize include:

 2022 - Kira L. Thurman, Singing Like Germans: Black Musicians in the Land of Bach, Beethoven, and Brahms
 2021 - Magda Teter, Blood Libel: On the Trail of an Antisemitic Myth
 2020 - Joan Neuberger, This Thing of Darkness: Eisenstein’s Ivan the Terrible in Stalin’s Russia 
 2019 - Guy Beiner, Forgetful Remembrance: Social Forgetting and Vernacular Historiography of a Rebellion in Ulster 
 2018 - Yuri Slezkine, The House of Government: A Saga of the Russian Revolution
 2017 - James T. Kloppenberg, Toward Democracy: The Struggle for Self-Rule in European and American Thought
 2016 - Thomas Laqueur, The Work of the Dead: A Cultural History of Mortal Remains
 2015 - Ekaterina Pravilova, A Public Empire: Property and the Quest for the Common Good in Imperial Russia
 2014 - Derek Sayer, Prague, Capital of the Twentieth Century: A Surrealist History
 2013 - Miranda Spieler, Empire and Underworld: Captivity in French Guiana
 2012 - Sophus A. Reinert, Translating Empire: Emulation and the Origins of Political Economy
 2011 - James Johnson, Venice Incognito: Masks in the Serene Republic
 2010 - Suzanne L. Marchand,  German Orientalism in the Age of Empire
 2009 - Stuart Schwartz, All Can Be Saved: Religious Tolerance and Salvation in the Iberian Atlantic World
 2008 - Atina Grossmann, Jews, Germans, and Allies: Close Encounters in Occupied Germany
 2007 - David Blackbourn, The Conquest of Nature: Water, Landscape, and the Making of Modern Germany
 2006 - Sandra Herbert, Charles Darwin, Geologist
 2005 - Jonathan Sheehan, The Enlightenment Bible: Translation, Scholarship, Culture
 2004 - Siep Stuurman, Francois Poulain de la Barre and the Invention of Modern Equality
 2003 - Sarah Maza, The Myth of the French Bourgeoises: An Essay on the Social Imaginary, 1750-1850
 2002 - Anthony LaVopa, Fichte: The Self and the Calling of Philosophy, 1762-99
 2001 - Lionel Gossman, Basel in the Age of Burckhardt: A Study in Unseasonable Ideas
 2000 - Richard Wortman, Scenarios of Power: Myth and Ceremony in Russian Monarchy: From Alexander II to the Abdication of Nicholas II

See also

 List of history awards

References

External links 

 

Academic awards
American Historical Association book prizes
American non-fiction literary awards
American history awards